Susima (also Sushima) was the Crown prince of the Maurya Empire of ancient India and the eldest son and heir-apparent of the second Mauryan emperor Bindusara. He was next in line for his father's throne, but was killed by his younger half-brother, Ashoka The Great for the throne, who eventually succeeded Bindusara as the third Mauryan emperor.

Birth and family
Susima was the eldest son of the second mauryan emperor Bindusara. Not only was Susima the crown prince, but also his mother was a princess as opposed to Ashoka's mother, Subhadrangi, who was a commoner.

Cultural depictions
 Ajith Kumar portrayed Sushim in the 2001 Bollywood film Aśoka.
 Ankit Arora portrayed the role of Sushim in the historical drama series Chakravartin Ashoka Samrat.
 Sumedh Mudgalkar played the young version.

References

Indian royalty
Mauryan dynasty